The Rockledge Drive Residential District is a U.S. historic district (designated as such on August 21, 1992) located in Rockledge, Florida. The district runs from 15 through 23 Rockledge Avenue, 219 through 1361 Rockledge Drive and 1 through 11 Orange Avenue. It contains 100 historic buildings.

References

External links
 Brevard County listings at National Register of Historic Places

Houses in Brevard County, Florida
National Register of Historic Places in Brevard County, Florida
Historic districts on the National Register of Historic Places in Florida